David Adams Richards  (born 17 October 1950) is a Canadian writer and member of the Canadian Senate.

Background
Born in Newcastle, New Brunswick, Richards left St. Thomas University in Fredericton, three credits shy of completing a BA. After publishing a poetry chapbook in 1972, he won the Norma Epstein Award, a literary prize for unpublished writing by Canadian university students, in 1974 for an excerpt from his novel manuscript The Coming of Winter, and the novel was published later that year as his fiction debut.

Career
Over his career as a writer, Richards has published novels, stage plays, short stories and non-fiction work. His fiction typically addresses the lives and experiences of poor and working class residents of the Miramichi region of New Brunswick, exploring spiritual and philosophical themes influenced by Richards' Roman Catholic faith.

Richards has been a writer-in-residence at various universities and colleges across Canada, including the University of New Brunswick.

On 30 August 2017, the appointment of Richards to the Senate of Canada on the advice of Prime Minister Justin Trudeau was announced.

On 25 April 2018, Richards resigned from the Independent Senators Group to sit as a non-caucusing independent senator. Richards stressed that he had not felt pressured by the ISG, saying that he left because he wants a high degree of personal autonomy, citing how he never joined the Writers' Union of Canada or PEN Canada as an author. Richards also said that since Trudeau had appointed him as an independent, he felt it was his duty to be as independent as possible.

On 4 November 2019, he joined the Canadian Senators Group.

Awards
Richards has received numerous awards including two Gemini Awards for scriptwriting for Small Gifts and For Those Who Hunt the Wounded Down, the Alden Nowlan Award for Excellence in the Arts, and the Canadian Authors Association Award for his novel Evening Snow Will Bring Such Peace. Richards is one of only three writers to have won in both the fiction and non-fiction categories of the Governor General's Award. He won the 1988 fiction award for Nights Below Station Street and the 1998 non-fiction award for Lines on the Water: A Fisherman's Life on the Miramichi. He was also a co-winner of the 2000 Giller Prize for Mercy Among the Children. The Writers' Federation of New Brunswick administers an annual David Adams Richards Prize for Fiction.

In 2009, he was made a Member of the Order of Canada "for his contributions to the Canadian literary scene as an essayist, screenwriter and writer of fiction and non-fiction".

In 2011, Richards received the Matt Cohen Prize.

Bibliography
Richards' papers are currently housed at the University of New Brunswick.

In 2014, Halifax singer-songwriter Dan MacCormack released an album of songs inspired by Richards' novels, called Symphony of Ghosts. The title was taken from a line in Mercy Among the Children.

Novels

 The Coming of Winter (1974)
 Blood Ties (1976)
 Lives of Short Duration (1981)
 Road to the Stilt House (1985)
 Nights Below Station Street (1988, winner of the 1988 Governor General's Award for fiction)
 Evening Snow Will Bring Such Peace (1990)
 For Those Who Hunt the Wounded Down (1993, nominated for a Governor General's Award, winner of the 1994 Thomas Head Raddall Award)
 Hope in the Desperate Hour (1996)
 The Bay of Love and Sorrows (1998)
 Mercy Among the Children (2000) (co-winner of the Giller Prize)
 River of the Broken-Hearted (2004)
 The Friends of Meager Fortune (2006) (longlisted for the Giller Prize)
 The Lost Highway (2007) (longlisted for the Giller Prize, Nominated Governor General's Awards 2008 Governor General's Award)
 Incidents in the Life of Markus Paul (2011)
 Crimes Against My Brother (2014)
 Principles to Live By (2016)
 Mary Cyr (2018)

Poetry
 Small Heroics (1972) (chapbook)

Plays
 The Dungarvon Whooper (1975)
 Water Carrier, Bones and Earth (1983)
 Hockey Dreams (2009)

Short stories
 Dancers at Night (1978)
 Dane (1978)
The Christmas Tree (2008)

Non-fiction
 A Lad From Brantford and Other Essays (1994)
 Hockey Dreams: Memories of a Man Who Couldn't Play (1996)
 Lines on the Water: A Fisherman's Life on the Miramichi (1998, winner of the 1998 Governor General's Award)
 Extraordinary Canadians: Lord Beaverbrook (2008)
 God is. (2009)
 Facing the Hunter: Reflections on a Misunderstood Way of Life (2011)
 Murder and Other Essays (2019)

General
 "Non-Judgmental Truth: An Interview with David Adams Richards" by Craig Proctor, Blood & Aphorisms (Winter 1998)

Personal life
In 1971, Richards married the former Peggy McIntyre. They have two sons, John Thomas Richards and Anton Richards, and reside in Fredericton .

References

External links
 
 Richards' item at English-Canadian writers, Aathabasca University, by Vivian Zenari; incl. several hyperlinks

1950 births
Living people
Canadian male novelists
Writers from New Brunswick
Members of the Order of New Brunswick
Members of the Order of Canada
Governor General's Award-winning fiction writers
Governor General's Award-winning non-fiction writers
People from Miramichi, New Brunswick
People from Northumberland County, New Brunswick
Canadian senators from New Brunswick
Independent Canadian senators
Canadian Senators Group
Canadian Roman Catholics
Canadian male non-fiction writers